The 1989 Chicago Bruisers season was the third and final season for the Chicago Bruisers. The Bruisers finished 1–3 and lost in the semi-finals to the Detroit Drive.

Regular season

Schedule

Standings

y – clinched regular-season title

x – clinched playoff spot

Playoffs

Roster

Awards

Chicago Bruisers seasons
Chicago Bruisers Season, 1989
Chicago Bruisers
1980s in Chicago
1989 in Illinois